Sleep-related hallucination may refer to:

 Hypnagogic hallucination – hallucinations while falling asleep
 Dreaming – conscious experiences during sleep
 Hypnopompic hallucination – hallucinations while waking up